Onam Station is an underground station of the Seoul Subway Line 4 in Namyangju, Gyeonggi Province, South Korea.

Station layout

References

Seoul Metropolitan Subway stations
Metro stations in Namyangju
Railway stations in South Korea opened in 2022